Perlis was part of Kedah Sultanate from at least the mid-16th century. Its boundaries were first demarcated in 1770, when Kedah's Sultan, Muhammad Jiwa II, presented the territory to his younger son, the then Tunku Dhiauddin. When Tunku Dhiauddin ascended the Kedah throne, he in turn presented Arau to his son in law Syed Harun Jamalullail, who assumed the title of Penghulu ('chief') of Arau. In 1825, Syed Harun died and his son Syed Hussein succeeded him as Penghulu of Arau. He assumed office during a period of turmoil when Kedah, including Perlis was invaded by Siam, and later administered by the Siamese governor of Ligor. Following the death of Governor of Ligor in 1839, Perlis was detached from Kedah and designated a separate tributary of Siam. A Malay chieftain was appointed Chiom ('chief') of Perlis while Syed Hussein was made his deputy. Within four months however, the Chiom of Perlis died and in 1841, Syed Hussein travelled to Bangkok and secured the recognition from Rama III to install him as the Phya ('King') of Perlis. His accession marked the founding of Jamalullail dynasty which continues to rule Perlis to present day.

References

Bibliography

References

Perlis